Fabiola Johana Herrera Zegarra (born 18 June 1987) is a Peruvian footballer who plays as a centre back for Club Universitario de Deportes and the Peru women's national team. She is also a futsal player, who appeared at the 2017 Copa América Femenina de Futsal for Peru. Besides Peru, she has played in Colombia.

Club career
Herrera is a former player of Sport Girls.

International career
Herrera played for Peru at senior level in the 2006 South American Women's Football Championship. She also appeared in a 0–12 friendly loss to Chile on 28 May 2017.

References

1987 births
Living people
Peruvian women's footballers
Women's association football central defenders
Peru women's international footballers
Sport Boys footballers
Millonarios F.C. players
Peruvian expatriate footballers
Peruvian expatriate sportspeople in Colombia
Expatriate women's footballers in Colombia
Peruvian women's futsal players